Mom's on Strike is a television film starring Faith Ford and Tim Matheson. It premiered on ABC Family in 2002.  It was directed by James Keach and written by Nancey Silvers. It is a remake and expansion of a 1984 episode of ABC Afterschool Special also titled "Mom's on Strike".

Plot
When an overworked housewife goes on strike to persuade the rest of her family to share in household chores, she becomes a national celebrity.

Cast
 Faith Ford as Pam Harris  
 Tim Matheson as Alan Harris
 Florence Henderson as Betty 
 Spencer Breslin as Sam Harris

References

External links
 

2002 television films
2002 films
ABC Family original films
Films directed by James Keach